The 1927 Saint Mary's Gaels football team was an American football team that represented Saint Mary's College of California during the 1927 college football season.  In their seventh season under head coach Slip Madigan, the Gaels compiled a 7–2–1 record, shut out seven opponents, won the Far Western Conference championship, and outscored all opponents by a combined total of 155 to 28.  The Gaels' victories including a 16-0 besting of Stanford. The Gaels also lost to California, 13–0.

Center Larry Bettencourt was selected by the Associated Press as a first-team member of the 1927 All-Pacific Coast football team; he was later inducted into the College Football Hall of Fame.

Schedule

References

Saint Mary's
Saint Mary's Gaels football seasons
Northern California Athletic Conference football champion seasons
Saint Mary's Gaels football